Captain William Wellwood   (1893 – 28 Jun 1971) was the Ulster Unionist Party MP for Londonderry in the Westminster Parliament from 1951 to 1955.

Following the resignation of incumbent MP Ronald Ross, Wellwood was elected unopposed in a by-election on 19 May 1951.  He was one of the last four MPs to be unopposed in a general election, on 25 October 1951.

He retired at the 1955 United Kingdom general election, and was replaced by Robin Chichester-Clark.

References

External links
 They Work For You

1893 births
1971 deaths
Ulster Unionist Party members of the House of Commons of the United Kingdom
Recipients of the Military Cross
Members of the Parliament of the United Kingdom for County Londonderry constituencies (since 1922)
UK MPs 1950–1951
UK MPs 1951–1955